Gow Ali (also Romanized as Gow Ālī, Gūālī, Gavaali, Gavālī; also known as Gawatali) is a village in Bonab Rural District, in the Central District of Zanjan County, Zanjan Province, Iran. At the 2006 census, its population was 117, in 31 families.

References 

Populated places in Zanjan County